WDIF-LP is a non-commercial low-power FM broadcasting station in Marion, Ohio featuring an all-blues format.

It is the only Ohio radio station with a full-time blues format.

WDIF-LP is underwritten locally by local businesses and listener support.

In addition to the station's audiostream from its website and the TuneIn app, it also hosts a yearly barbeque and blues festival in downtown Marion during the month of September.

External links
 Official WDIF-LP website (with streaming audio and playlist)
 Marion Makes Music dot org
 

DIF-LP
DIF-LP
WDIF-LP